Abba Kyari  (23 September 1952 – 17 April 2020) was a Nigerian lawyer who served as Chief of Staff to the President of Nigeria from August 2015 to April 2020.

Early life 
Kyari was born on 23 September 1952, to a Shuwa Arab family from Borno. He was educated in St. Paul's College in Wusasa Zaria, and later considered joining the Nigerian Army following advice from Mamman Daura and Ibrahim Tahir. In 1976, he met General Muhammadu Buhari who was then Governor of Borno State.

Education 
He graduated with a bachelor's degree in sociology from the University of Warwick in 1980, and also obtained a law degree from the University of Cambridge. Kyari was called to the Nigerian Bar in 1983 after attending the Nigerian Law School. In 1984, he obtained a master's degree in law from the University of Cambridge. He later attended the International Institute for Management Development in Lausanne, Switzerland, and in 1992 and 1994 participated in the Harvard Business School's Program for Leadership Development.

Career 
Kyari worked for the law firm Fani-Kayode and Sowemimo for some time after his return to Nigeria.

From 1988 to 1990, he was editor with the New Africa Holdings Limited Kaduna. He was a Commissioner for Forestry and Animal Resources in Borno State in the 1990s.

From 1990 to 1995, Kyari was the secretary to the board of the African International Bank Limited, a subsidiary of Bank of Credit and Commerce International.

Kyari was an executive director in charge of management services at the United Bank for Africa, and was later appointed the chief executive officer. In 2002, he was appointed a board director of Unilever Nigeria, and later served on the board of Exxon Mobil Nigeria.

Chief of Staff to the President 
In August 2015, Kyari was appointed Chief of Staff to President Muhammadu Buhari. As chief of staff, he was widely considered to be the face of the "cabal" and the most powerful person in the Buhari administration.

During the administration's first term, he worked mainly behind the scenes to implement the president's agenda. In 2019 with Buhari's re-election for a second term, he ordered his cabinet to channel all requests through Kyari's office — further enhancing his influence within government circles, and being labelled as the de facto head of government.

In 2017, following a leaked memo, Kyari became embroiled in a public argument with the Head of Civil Service, who was later removed from office and arrested. In 2020, in another leaked memo, Babagana Monguno the National Security Adviser accused Kyari of meddling in matters of national security.

Family 
Kyari was married to the sister-in-law of Ibrahim Tahir, and had four children, Aisha, Nurudeen, Ibrahim, Zainab.

Death 
On 24 March 2020, it was made public that he had tested positive for COVID-19, following an official trip to Germany nine days before. There were reports that he had been flown out of the country for treatment, and Reuters later reported he had "a history of medical complications, including diabetes".

On 29 March 2020, Kyari announced he was being moved from isolation in Abuja to Lagos for "preventive treatment". Kyari later died on the evening of 17 April 2020 at age 67. His death was a very huge blow to the nation. He was eulogised by The Economist as "a largely honourable man who went to the heart of a thoroughly corrupt and dysfunctional system, aiming to reform it—but who struggled to overcome its inertia amid a series of crises."

Honours and awards

References

1952 births
2020 deaths
Deaths from the COVID-19 pandemic in Nigeria
Nigerian Law School alumni
Alumni of the University of Cambridge
Alumni of the University of Warwick
International Institute for Management Development alumni
Officers of the Order of the Niger
Kanuri people
Nigerian expatriates in the United Kingdom
20th-century Nigerian businesspeople
20th-century Nigerian lawyers
21st-century Nigerian businesspeople
21st-century Nigerian lawyers
Buhari administration personnel
People from Borno State
Nigerian corporate directors